Neal Steinhauer (August 18, 1944 – September 7, 2020) was an American track and field athlete. He won a silver medal in the shot put at the 1967 Pan American Games, behind Randy Matson, and also won two medals at the 1967 Summer Universiade in Tokyo (gold in the shot put and bronze in the discus). A one-time American national champion (in 1969). Steinhauer set his personal best (21.01 m) on March 25, 1967, at a meet in Sacramento.  He was on the cover of the February 1969 issue of Track and Field News.

References

1944 births
2020 deaths
American male shot putters
Athletes (track and field) at the 1967 Pan American Games
Oregon Ducks men's track and field athletes
Pan American Games silver medalists for the United States
Pan American Games medalists in athletics (track and field)
Universiade medalists in athletics (track and field)
Universiade gold medalists for the United States
Universiade bronze medalists for the United States
Medalists at the 1967 Summer Universiade
Medalists at the 1967 Pan American Games